Gladiolus mariae is a species of the genus Gladiolus of perennial cormous flowering plants in the family Iridaceae.

The species was first described in 2019, found growing endemicly on two table mountains in the Kounounkan Forest Reserve near Moussaya, Forécariah, Guinea, West Africa. It was named as one of Kew Gardens Top 10 plants discovered in 2019 and has been assessed as potentially critically endangered.

Description
It has up to 6 orange flowers.

References

External links
 

mariae